Mizni Dol (sometimes also Mizendol) is a small settlement in the hills west of Vrhnika in the Inner Carniola region of Slovenia.

History
The independent settlement of Mizni Dol was created in 2002, when the territory was separated from the settlement of Zaplana. Prior to this, Mizni Dol was a hamlet of Zaplana.

References

External links
Mizni Dol on Geopedia

Populated places in the Municipality of Vrhnika